Ą̃ (minuscule: ą̃), called A tilde ogonek, is a Latin letter used in the writing of the Lithuanian language.
It consists of the letter A diacriticised with a tilde and an ogonek.

Usage 

In Lithuanian, the A ogonek  can be combined with a tilde to indicate a tonic syllable: .

Computer representations 

The A tilde ogonek can be represented by the following Unicode characters: 
 Composed of normalised NFC (Latin Extended-A, Combining Diacritical Marks) : 

 Decomposed and normalised NFD (Basic Latin, Combining Diacritical Marks) :

See also
 A
 Tilde
 Ogonek

Notes and references

Bibliography 

 Lithuanian Standards Board, Proposal to add Lithuanian accented letters to the UCS, 5 December 2011. (copy online)

Latin letters with diacritics
Letters with tilde